Miorin is a surname. Notable people with the surname include:

Devis Miorin (born 1976), Italian cyclist
Hugues Miorin (born 1968), French rugby union player

See also
Miori